The United States chemical mortar battalions were army units attached to U.S. infantry divisions during World War II. They were armed with 4.2-inch (107 mm) chemical mortars. For this reason they were also called the "Four-deucers".

Chemical mortar battalions

Originally, chemical mortar battalions consisted of a headquarters company and four mortar companies. In 1943, this "square" organization was modified to three mortar companies for a better fit with the three infantry regiments of the "triangular" infantry divisions.

Per Table of Organization and Equipment 3-25 of 29 September 1944, a typical chemical mortar battalion had an establishment of 37 officers, 138 NCOs and 481 junior enlisted men not counting the attached medical detachment. It consisted of:

 1 chemical mortar battalion headquarters company, containing:
 1 company headquarters section (4 officers, 4 noncommissioned officers, and 14 junior enlisted men)
 1 battalion headquarters section (5 officers, 6 noncommissioned officers, and 20 junior enlisted men 
 1 maintenance section (1 officer, 2 noncommissioned officers, and 6 junior enlisted men)
 3 ammunition sections (each of 2 noncommissioned officers and 29 junior enlisted men)
 3 chemical mortar companies
 Attached medical detachment (1 officer, 1 noncommissioned officer, and 13 junior enlisted men)

A chemical mortar company usually had an establishment of 9 officers, 40 noncommissioned officers and 118 junior enlisted men. It consisted of:
 1 chemical mortar company headquarters section (three officers, seven noncommissioned officers, and 28 junior enlisted men)
 3 mortar platoons

A mortar platoon consisted of:
 One platoon headquarters (two officers, three noncommissioned officers, and six junior enlisted men)
 Four mortar squads, each of which had one squad leader, (noncommissioned officer) one gunner, (noncommissioned officer) one assistant gunner, (junior enlisted man) three ammunition bearers, (junior enlisted men) and two truck drivers (junior enlisted men)

Chemical mortar battalions were not assigned as integral parts of divisions or other units. As other units went into combat, chemical mortar battalions were attached to them as support. In 1943, General Mark Clark's Fifth Army established a policy that no infantry division would be committed to combat without a chemical mortar battalion attached. As a result, when infantry units were rotated out of combat, the mortar battalions often stayed in the line and were attached to the fresh infantry unit. Chemical mortars were in such high demand that often the companies of a battalion would be split up and assigned to different divisions. Two Fifth Army antiaircraft battalions were retrained as chemical mortar battalions (99th and 100th) On the first day that General George Patton's Third Army became operational, in the summer of 1944, he issued a standing order to his staff that no infantry division would be committed to combat without a chemical mortar battalion attached, and no infantry regiment would be committed without a mortar company attached.

Battalion numbering

During World War II, 25 chemical mortar battalions were sent overseas:
 the 2nd and 3rd Battalions
 the 71st and 72nd Battalions
 the 80th to 100th Battalions

Seven additional battalions (the 443rd, 483rd, 534th, 537th, 560th, 781st and 782nd) were converted from field artillery battalions during the war, but were activated too late to serve overseas.

After World War II, the U.S. War Department transferred the operations and development of chemical mortars to the Ordnance Department, in this way making the mortar an official infantry weapon.

The 2nd Chemical Mortar Battalion was the last of the chemical mortar battalions; and the only one to see combat after World War II. It was reactivated in 1949 and saw 1,008 days of combat during the Korean War. In January 1953, its combat personnel were transferred to the 461st Infantry Battalion (Heavy Mortar.)

Chemical mortars

Chemical mortars are so named because of their capability of firing not only high explosive, but also chemical, gas, incendiary and smoke marker shells. Chemical shells were on standby during World War II, to be used in retaliation should the enemy employ chemical weapons first.

These same mortars, using high-explosive shells, came to be acknowledged by U.S. Army commanders and personnel as being one of the most effective means of quickly striking at stationary targets, such as machine gun nests, prepared strongpoints, pillboxes and even German artillery positions. Other advantages chemical mortars offered compared to full-sized artillery pieces were their maneuverability, along with easy assembly, disassembly and reassembly. The mortars, due to their relatively small size, were able to fire high explosive shells from concealed positions, such as natural escarpments on hillsides, or from woods. The rifled barrel gave the mortar remarkable accuracy; fire was often called on targets within fifty yards of friendly positions. The low-velocity shells were totally silent in transit and gave no warning of their powerful explosions (the M2 mortar's M3 high explosive shell contained 3.64 kilograms of explosives, placing it midway between the 2.18 kilograms of the 105 mm howitzer M2A1's M1 shell and the 6.88 kilograms of the 155 mm howitzer M1's M102 shell), which tended to create panic among enemy forces who were unexpectedly subjected to their firepower. The mortar was called the "grass-cutter" by German troops because its high explosive shell exploded and fragmented just a few inches above ground level. The mortars often fired white phosphorus munitions (WP) shells to block enemy observation with smoke; white phosphorus also caused casualties and fires, being especially effective against dug-in troops because the burning particles arced upward and fell directly down into foxholes.

The development and capabilities of the chemical mortar

The 4.2 in (107 mm) chemical mortar was developed from the British World War I-era 4 inch (101.6 mm) Stokes mortar. The Stokes mortar could fire twenty shells per minute and had a range of 1,100 yards (1,006 m) and in this way was capable of overwhelming enemy trenches. The American-built M1 4.2 inch (107 mm) mortar, first introduced in 1924, had a rifled barrel and a range of 2,300 yards. By the 1930s, after modifying the bore, improving the two-legged support and the recoil mechanism, and producing barrels made of seamless nickel steel, the M1A1 model was capable of sending shells 2,400 yards (2,195 m) By 1942, after authorization had been sought and granted to use high-explosive shells, the new M2 model was produced with a stronger barrel.

History

In 1935, the 2nd Chemical Mortar Battalion was established at Edgewood Arsenal Maryland with the chemical mortar as its primary weapon. At the onset of World War II, there were a few other mortar battalions and companies, including one that was lost on Bataan in the Philippines. In 1942, General George Marshall ordered the formation of five additional chemical mortar battalions equipped with the mortar (the 3rd, and the 81st through 84th) Later, the mortar was developed to be capable of instantly firing shells from a mere 565 yards (517 m) at minimum propellant charge, to a range of 4,400 yards (4,023 m) by having propellant-charge disks of powder added that by then were being manufactured as square disks with a hole in the middle, strung together, fitted into cartridges and sewn together into bundles of various thickness. Its rate of fire was 40 rounds in the first two minutes, 100 rounds in the first 20 minutes and thereafter a sustained rate of 80 rounds per hour. These variations were caused by the stresses and strains on the barrels and the rest of firing mechanisms that were being imposed by different firing conditions.

The mortars were transported in 3/4 ton trucks or on hand carts, in island engagements in the Pacific by boat, and in difficult terrain by mule.

During the Allied invasion of Sicily in the summer of 1943 - the first time the mortar was used in wartime - 35,000 rounds were fired in 38 days, of which more than 90% were high explosive.

References 

Chemical battalions of the United States Army
World War II mortars